Sam Fowler may refer to:

 Sam and Amanda Fowler, fictional characters from the American soap opera Another World
 Sam Fowler (soccer) (born 2000), American soccer player